The 1st Rhode Island Infantry Regiment were two regiments of the United States Army, the first of which was raised in 1861 at the beginning of the American Civil War on a 90-day enlistment, the second during the Spanish–American War in 1898.

1st Rhode Island Infantry Regiment
The 1st Rhode Island Infantry Regiment was originally called the 1st Rhode Island Detached Militia. It was organized in Rhode Island in April 1861 and moved to Washington, D. C. It was attached to Ambrose Burnside's Brigade in Irvin McDowell's Army of Northeastern Virginia on July 16 after duty at Camp Sprague in the defense of Washington. The regiment advanced on Manassas, Virginia on July 16–21, seeing action at the First Battle of Bull Run on July 21. It left Washington, D.C. for home on July 25 and mustered out on August 2, 1861. During its service, the regiment lost a total of 25 men.

1st Regiment, Rhode Island Volunteers
Under proclamation signed April 23, 1898, President William McKinley ordered the call up of 125,000 troops. Rhode Island was directed by Secretary of War Russell A. Alger to raise a regiment of infantry from existing militia units in lieu of conscripting 720 individuals to augment the Regular Army as U.S. Volunteers by letter dated April 25, 1898. On May 2 the state established a camp site at Quonset Point in Rhode Island, and formally named the site "Camp Dyer" in honor of Governor Elisha Dyer, Jr. on May 7, 1898. The regiment began to muster until fully assembled between May 10 and 17, with Colonel Charles Wheaton Abbot, Jr., commanding. Initially the unit consisted of forty-six officers and 958 enlisted men. This regiment, the only infantry regiment raised on Rhode Island during the war, was constituted of several militia infantry units in Rhode Island as well as individual volunteers.

The unit was assigned to the 3rd Division, Second Army Corps and reported for duty at Camp Alger, Virginia, from late May. However the regiment and the rest of Second Corps left Camp Alger in early August 1898, due to a typhoid fever epidemic. The regiment relocated to another part of Virginia at Thoroughfare Gap in an attempted run from the virus. However, conditions in Thoroughfare Gap resulted in dysentery and malaria, and the unit eventually relocated to Camp Meade, Pennsylvania, with the rest of Second Corps in August 1898. The overcrowded conditions forced the relocation of the 3rd Brigade of the 2nd Division of Second Corps to Camp Fornance, South Carolina.

The regiment was mustered out of federal service on March 30, 1899, at Columbia, South Carolina. The unit returned to Providence and handed over colors to Governor Elisha Dyer after a parade past city hall on April 1, 1899. At the time of muster-out, the regiment included forty-five officers and 1,039 enlisted men. During its term of service, the unit lost eleven enlisted men who died from disease and one enlisted man who died as the result of an accident. Thirty-five more enlisted men were discharged for disability. The unit also had thirteen enlisted men court-martialed and eighty-nine men deserted the regiment.

The regiment nicknamed itself the "Rough Walkers" which was inspired by Roosevelt's Rough Riders. Veterans of the regiment received an unofficial medal called the Rough Walker Medal.

Unit timeline
 May 20, 1898, fully mustered at Camp Dyer, Quonset Point, Warwick, Rhode Island.
 May 27, departed Camp Dyer for Camp Alger, Dunn Loring, Virginia.
 May 30, arrived in Camp Alger.
 Aug 3, departed Camp Alger for Thoroughfare Gap, Virginia.
 Aug 8, arrived in Thoroughfare Gap.
 Aug 21/22, departed Thoroughfare Gap for Camp George Meade, Harrisburg, Pennsylvania.
 Aug 23/24, arrived at Camp George Meade.
 Nov 13, departed Camp George Meade for Camp Fornance, Columbia, South Carolina.
 Mar 1, 1899, unit disarmed, and muster out date set for March 30.
 Mar 30, mustered out of service at Camp Fornance, departed for Jersey City, New Jersey, by rail road.
 May 31, arrived in Jersey City and embarked aboard the steamer Rhode Island for Providence, Rhode Island.
 Apr 1, 1899, arrived at India Point wharf and paraded past city hall, and turned over colors at Dexter parade ground (unit temporarily rearmed at pier and disarmed at parade ground).

Organization
 First Regiment Rhode Island Volunteers
 Field and Staff
 1st Battalion (Companies A, B, C and D)
 2nd Battalion (Companies E, F, G and H)
 3rd Battalion (Companies I, K, L and M)

Other units
In addition to the first regiment, the state of Rhode Island raised the following units for the war with Spain:
 Light Battery A, 1st Rhode Island Volunteer Artillery.
 Light Battery B, 1st Rhode Island Volunteer Artillery.
 1st Provisional Company of Infantry commanded by Lieutenant Theodore Francis Green, a future Governor of Rhode Island and United States Senator.
 Members of the Rhode Island Naval Militia who served under federal orders.
 Members of the state Rhode Island Militia Hospital Corps who served under federal orders.

See also
 1st Rhode Island Regiment, American Revolutionary War unit
 Rhode Island in the American Civil War
 List of Rhode Island Civil War units
 Kady Brownell

References

 Rhode Island in the War with Spain, published by Rhode Island and Providence Plantation, a compilation of records and letters, compiled 1900.

External links
 

Units and formations of the Union Army from Rhode Island
Military units and formations of the United States in the Spanish–American War
1861 establishments in Rhode Island